Kills on Wheels is a 2016 Hungarian black comedy crime film directed by Attila Till. It was selected as the Hungarian entry for the Best Foreign Language Film at the 89th Academy Awards but it was not nominated.

Plot
Three young men who use wheelchairs, unsure of their future and lacking familial support, decide to become assassins for hire.

Cast
 Szabolcs Thuróczy as Rupaszov
 Zoltán Fenyvesi as Zolika
 Ádám Fekete as Barba Papa
 Mónika Balsai as Zita
 Lídia Danis as Évi

See also
 List of submissions to the 89th Academy Awards for Best Foreign Language Film
 List of Hungarian submissions for the Academy Award for Best Foreign Language Film

References

External links
  

2016 films
2016 comedy films
Hungarian comedy films
2010s Hungarian-language films